Troglostenochrus is a genus of hubbardiid short-tailed whipscorpions, first described by Monjaraz-Ruedas, Prendini & Francke in 2019.

Species 
, the World Schizomida Catalog accepts the following two species:

 Troglostenochrus palaciosi (Reddell & Cokendolpher, 1986) – Mexico
 Troglostenochrus valdezi (Monjaraz-Ruedas, 2012) – Mexico

References 

Schizomida genera